FTM Magazine is a company founded in Rochester, New York, currently based in Albany, New York, that specifically represents FTM (female to male) trans men. It is a medium for trans masculine people to read other people’s stories and encourages people to share their own. The content on the official website is sorted into: News, Culture, Community, and Transitional. Popular topics include fashion, fitness, community stories, interviews, tips, and reviews. The company advertises through inter-community, and allied businesses rather than banner, or pop-up ads. The company acquires funding through T-shirt sales from their clothing line, and cover prices.

History 
FTM Magazine was first funded in November 2013. Jason Robert Ballard, ran the company independently for the first three years. The website was then launched in January 2014. The magazine released a photo of model Aydian Dowling recreating the famous Adam Levine photo which was featured in the Cosmopolitan (UK) for testicular and prostate cancer awareness. As a result of this photo's popularity, the magazine launched their clothing line: This Is What Trans Looks Like. Due to some backlash for being a binary exclusive company, the Fall 2017 issue was postponed. It has been reopened with a team as a media platform. The company is looking to reach a larger audience. There are tentative plans to create sub-domains of the magazine in different languages for countries outside of the US.

In 2017, FTM Magazine launched Trans Men Magazine which is a downloadable magazine with monthly topics, horoscopes, and an advise column.

In 2018, Aidan Faiella took over as CEO of the company.

Issues

Articles 

The founder of FTM Magazine is Jason Robert Ballard. Ballard published an autobiographical article on The New York Times website. He wrote about his personal experiences as a trans man. He said his inspiration for the magazine stemmed from the support he received from his own family and friends. He also acknowledged that there is a long way to go as far as visibility and normalization of trans people in the eyes of the public and the media.

On June 23, 2014, an article written by Mitch Kellaway entitled ‘LOOK: Will This Magazine Become the GQ of Trans Men?’ was published on the Advocate website. The article talks about Ballard’s vision for the magazine. In the interview, Ballard said that he noticed that the initial idea came while he was reading GQ magazine, hence the title of the article.

Notable Personnel

Writers 
Jason Robert Ballard - Founder of FTM Magazine
Aidan Faiella - CEO of FTM Magazine
Chris Rhodes - Founder of Flavnt, trans clothing company.
Mason Fitzpatrick - Staff Writer for Trans Men Magazine
Rory Q. Kelling - Staff Writer for Trans Men Magazine
Coach Cody - Staff Writer for Trans Men Magazine
Transformation Coach Cody - Staff Writer for Trans Men Magazine
Isaac Volbrecht - Staff Writer for Trans Men Magazine, Monthly Horoscopes
Malcolm R Ribot - FTM Traveler
Dani Farrell - Writer for FTM Magazine. Founder of Trans In Color and TBuddy.
Maxwell Hunter
Dash Hudson
Guest Writers - Many of the articles published in FTM Magazine are written by guest writers. There are open submissions for guest writers to submit their writing, which is then edited and published.

References

External links 
 official website
 https://ftmmag.com 
 http://thisiswhattranslookslike.com
http://ftmfitnessmagazine.com
http://ballardexclusives.com 
https://web.archive.org/web/20160708201050/http://www.theselfmademen.com/
http://transmanmagazine.com

Men's magazines published in the United States
2014 establishments
Transgender literature
Trans men's culture
LGBT literature in the United States